Samoon is a type of yeast bread that is consumed mainly in Iraq. It is baked in traditional stone ovens, like pizza.  This bread is one of the most widespread breads in Iraq, along with khubz. It is usually served with a variety of foods such as hummus, kebab, and shawarma. It is one of the most popular breads used in Iraq and across the Levant and variants can be found in Syria and Lebanon. It can be also found in other Middle Eastern and European countries.
 A key differentiator in most samoon is the use of live-culture yogurt as a leavener. Otherwise, the process of making it is relatively similar to pita.

References

External links
 https://www.youtube.com/watch?v=ki5wqSbvYMA

Arab cuisine
Assyrian cuisine
Flatbreads
Iraqi cuisine
Levantine cuisine
Yeast breads